Jaroslava Bukvajová (born 17 November 1975 in Banská Bystrica) is a Slovak cross-country skier who competed from 1994 to 2004. Her best World Cup finish was ninth twice, both earned in Austria in 1998.

Bukvajová also competed in three Winter Olympics, earning her best finish of tenth in the 15 km event at Nagano in 1998. Her best finish at the FIS Nordic World Ski Championships was 17th on three occasions (5 km: 1995, 5 km + 10 km combined pursuit and 30 km: both 1999).

Cross-country skiing results
All results are sourced from the International Ski Federation (FIS).

Olympic Games

World Championships

World Cup

References

External links
 

1975 births
Cross-country skiers at the 1994 Winter Olympics
Cross-country skiers at the 1998 Winter Olympics
Cross-country skiers at the 2002 Winter Olympics
Living people
Olympic cross-country skiers of Slovakia
Slovak female cross-country skiers
Universiade medalists in cross-country skiing
Slovak mountain runners
Universiade silver medalists for Slovakia
Universiade bronze medalists for Slovakia
Competitors at the 1999 Winter Universiade
Sportspeople from Banská Bystrica